Lake Badi, situated in Udaipur city in the Indian state of Rajasthan, is an artificial fresh water lake. The lake was built in the village of Badi, about 12 km from the city of Udaipur, by Maharana Raj Singh I (1652-1680) to counteract the devastating effects of a famine. He named it Jiyan Sagar after his mother Jana Devi. The lake covers an area of 155 km2., and has an embankment 180 m. long and 18 m. wide, which is graced by three artistic chhatris (kiosks or pavilions). During the drought of 1973, the lake supplied water to the people of Udaipur. Devoid of any commercial activity,  the Badi Lake gives a view of a never-ending expanse providing a serene and calm atmosphere to the visitors. The lake is amongst the major tourist attractions of the city.

One can easily reach Badi Lake either by taking regular buses or by hiring taxis from the city.

See also 
 Tourist attractions in Udaipur

References 

Badi
Tourist attractions in Udaipur
1684 establishments in India

External links

 Lake Badi – The Hidden Gem of City of Lakes Udaipur